July 6 - Eastern Orthodox Church calendar - July 8

All fixed commemorations below are celebrated on July 20 by Old Calendar.

For July 7th, Orthodox Churches on the Old Calendar commemorate the Saints listed on June 24.

Saints
 Martyrs Peregrinus, Lucian, Pompeius, Hesychius, Pappias, Saturninus, and Germanus, of Dyrrachium in Macedonia (2nd century)
 Saint Pantaenus the Confessor, head of the Orthodox School in Alexandria (c. 190 or 203)
 Hieromartyr Evangelus, Bishop of Tomi (Constanţa) in Moesia (c. 284-305)
 Saint Kyriaki the Great Martyr (Cyriaca, Dominica, Nedelja), of Nicomedia (289)
 Hieromartyr Eustathios (Eustace), by fire.
 Hieromartyrs Epictetus, presbyter, and Astion, monk, in Scythia (290)
 Venerable Acacius of Sinai, who is mentioned in The Ladder of Divine Ascent (6th century)
 Venerable Thomas of Mt. Maleon (Malevon), in Laconia (10th century)
 Newly-Revealed (1923) Hieromartyr Vlasios of Akarnania (Blaise), and those with him (1006)

Pre-Schism Western saints
 Saint Apollonius, an early Bishop of Brescia and Confessor.
 Saint Illidius (Iflidius, Allyre), fourth Bishop of Clermont in Gaul, greatly revered by St Gregory of Tours (385)
 Saint Prosper of Aquitaine, a married layman who devoted himself to theology (c.455)
 Saint Palladius, first Bishop of the Scots (5th century)
 Saint Bonitus, fourth Abbot of Monte Cassino (c. 582)
 Saint Felix of Nantes, a great Bishop of Nantes in France for some thirty-three years (584)
 Saints Medran and Odran, brothers and disciples of St. Kieran of Ossory (6th century)
 Saint Æthelburh of Faremoutiers (Ethelburgh, Ethelburga, Aubierge), an Anglo-Saxon princess and Abbess of Faremoutiers Abbey (c. 664)
 Saint Ampelius, Bishop of Milan in Italy under the Lombards (c. 672)
 Saint Hædde (Hedda), Bishop of the West Saxons (705)
 Saint Willibald, Anglo-Saxon missionary to the Germans, Bishop of Eichstätt and Enlightener of Bavaria (c. 787)
 Saint Máel Ruain of Tallaght (Maolruain), founder of monastery of Tallaght in Co. Dublin, Ireland (787)
 Saint Angelelmus, Abbot of Sts Gervase and Protase in Auxerre in France, and then Bishop of Auxerre (828)

Post-Schism Orthodox saints
 Venerable Eudoxia of Moscow, in monasticism Euphrosyne, Grand Duchess of Moscow (1407)
 Martyr Polycarp the New.

New martyrs and confessors
 New Hieromartyr Paul Chernyshev, Priest (1918)

Other commemorations
 Translation (1654) of the icon of the Theotokos Blachernitissa ("Vlaherensk") from Mount Athos to Moscow.
Kalinovka Miracle of the Bloody Crucifix (1923)
 Uncovering of the relics (2001) of Venerable Gerasimus, Abbot of Boldin (1554)
 Repose of Archimandrite Paisius (Tanasijevic), of the St. Prochorus of Pchinja Monastery, Serbia (2003)

Icon gallery

Notes

References

Sources
 July 7/July 20. Orthodox Calendar (PRAVOSLAVIE.RU).
 July 20 / July 7. HOLY TRINITY RUSSIAN ORTHODOX CHURCH (A parish of the Patriarchate of Moscow).
 July 7. OCA - The Lives of the Saints.
 July 7. The Year of Our Salvation - Holy Transfiguration Monastery, Brookline, Massachusetts. 
 The Autonomous Orthodox Metropolia of Western Europe and the Americas (ROCOR). St. Hilarion Calendar of Saints for the year of our Lord 2004. St. Hilarion Press (Austin, TX). p. 50.
 The Seventh Day of the Month of July. Orthodoxy in China.
 July 7. Latin Saints of the Orthodox Patriarchate of Rome.
 The Roman Martyrology. Transl. by the Archbishop of Baltimore. Last Edition, According to the Copy Printed at Rome in 1914. Revised Edition, with the Imprimatur of His Eminence Cardinal Gibbons. Baltimore: John Murphy Company, 1916. pp. 197–199.
 Rev. Richard Stanton. A Menology of England and Wales, or, Brief Memorials of the Ancient British and English Saints Arranged According to the Calendar, Together with the Martyrs of the 16th and 17th Centuries. London: Burns & Oates, 1892. pp. 316–324.
Greek Sources
 Great Synaxaristes:  7 ΙΟΥΛΙΟΥ. ΜΕΓΑΣ ΣΥΝΑΞΑΡΙΣΤΗΣ.
  Συναξαριστής. 7 Ιουλίου. ECCLESIA.GR. (H ΕΚΚΛΗΣΙΑ ΤΗΣ ΕΛΛΑΔΟΣ). 
  ΙΟΥΛΙΟΣ. Αποστολική Διακονία της Εκκλησίας της Ελλάδος (Apostoliki Diakonia of the Church of Greece).
  07/07/2018. Ορθόδοξος Συναξαριστής. 
Russian Sources
  20 июля (7 июля). Православная Энциклопедия под редакцией Патриарха Московского и всея Руси Кирилла (электронная версия). (Orthodox Encyclopedia - Pravenc.ru).
  7 июля по старому стилю / 20 июля по новому стилю. Русская Православная Церковь - Православный церковный календарь на 2018 год.
  7 июля (ст.ст.) 20 июля 2014 (нов. ст.). Русская Православная Церковь Отдел внешних церковных связей. (DECR).

July in the Eastern Orthodox calendar